Nieuwe Kerk (English: New Church) is a common name for churches in the Netherlands. It may refer to:

 Nieuwe Kerk (Amsterdam)
 Nieuwe Kerk (Delft)
 Nieuwe Kerk (Katwijk aan Zee)
 Nieuwe Kerk (The Hague)
 Nieuwe Kerk, Haarlem

See also
There are some Dutch towns with similar name, for instance:
 Nieuwerkerk, in Zeeland
 Nieuwerkerke, a hamlet near Nieuwerkerk
 Nieuwerkerk aan den IJssel, in South Holland